Events from the year 1895 in Michigan.

Office holders

State office holders
 Governor of Michigan: John Treadway Rich (Republican)
 Lieutenant Governor of Michigan: J. Wight Giddings/Alfred Milnes/Joseph R. McLaughlin
 Michigan Attorney General: Adolphus A. Ellis/Fred A. Maynard
 Michigan Secretary of State: Washington Gardner (Republican)
 Speaker of the Michigan House of Representatives: William D. Gordon
 Chief Justice, Michigan Supreme Court:

Mayors of major cities

 Mayor of Detroit: Hazen S. Pingree (Republican)
 Mayor of Grand Rapids: Charles D. Stebbins
 Mayor of Saginaw: William B. Mershon

Federal office holders

 U.S. Senator from Michigan: Julius C. Burrows (Republican)
 U.S. Senator from Michigan: James McMillan (Republican) 
 House District 1: Levi T. Griffin (Democrat)/John Blaisdell Corliss (Republican)
 House District 2: James S. Gorman (Democrat)/George Spalding (Republican)
 House District 3: Alfred Milnes (Republican)
 House District 4: Henry F. Thomas (Republican)
 House District 5: George F. Richardson (Democrat)/William Alden Smith (Republican)
 House District 6: David D. Aitken (Republican)
 House District 7: Justin Rice Whiting (Democrat)/Horace G. Snover (Republican)
 House District 8: William S. Linton (Republican)
 House District 9: John W. Moon (Republican)/Roswell P. Bishop (Republican)
 House District 10: Thomas A. E. Weadock (Democrat)/Rousseau Owen Crump (Republican)
 House District 11: John Avery (Republican)
 House District 12: Samuel M. Stephenson (Republican)

Population

Sports

Baseball
 1895 Detroit Tigers season – The Detroit baseball team, known for the first time in 1895 as the Tigers, competed in the Western League. The Tigers finished in sixth place with a 57–67 record. The team's statistical leaders included Sam Dungan with a .424 batting average, Al McCauley with 15 home runs, Count Campau with 44 stolen bases, and Robert Gayle with 22 pitching wins. George A. Van Derbeck was the team's owner and manager.
 1895 Grand Rapids Gold Bugs season – The Grand Rapids baseball team, known as the Gold Bugs, also competed in the Western League during the 1895 season. The Gold Bugs finished in last place with a 38–84 record.
 1895 Michigan Wolverines baseball season – The Wolverines compiled a 19–3–1 record. Edmund Shields was the team captain.

American football
 1895 Michigan Wolverines football team – The Wolverines compiled an 8–1 record, won seven of their games by shutouts, and outscored their opponents by a combined score of 266 to 14.
 1895 Michigan State Normal Normalites football team – Under head coach Marcus Cutler, the Normalites compiled a record of 3–3, and outscored by their opponents by a combined total of 119 to 54.

Chronology of events

January
 January 1 – John T. Rich was sworn in as Governor of Michigan in a ceremony at Lansing.
 January 23 – Both houses of the Michigan Legislature met in joint session for an election to fill Michigan's seats in the U.S. Senate. James McMillan was unanimously reelected a full term. Julius C. Burrows was elected for a term of four years.
 January 24 – Wreckage from the steamer Chicora was found in Lake Michigan from Benton Harbor to South Haven. All 26 persons aboard the ship were lost in a winter storm, and wreckage continued to drift ashore in the months that followed.
 January 26 – Contingents supporting and opposing Detroit Mayor Pingree clashed at the Detroit Auditorium over the Thompson health bill and a proposal in Lansing to strip the Mayor of the power to appoint a health commissioner. The Detroit Free Press called the clash of the two factions "a spectacle never before witnessed in this city or state."

February
 February 2 – Dr. Horace Eliot Pope was murdered in Detroit, his skull shattered to pieces by blows from a hatchet wielded by William Brusseau, a barber. Brusseau claimed he was defending himself and Pope's wife from an attack by Pope.  The police alleged that the murder was motivated by life insurance on Pope. Brusseau then changed his story and claimed that Mrs. Pope had murdered her husband after weeks of planning. On June 4, the wife, Nellie Pope, was convicted of first degree murder and sentenced to life in prison.
 February 13 – Sen. McMillan proposed that Fort Mackinac, which had been decommissioned, be transferred to the State of Michigan for use as a park. McMillan's plan was approved, and Mackinac Island State Park became the first state park in Michigan.

April
 April 16 – The Detroit Free Press referred to the Detroit baseball club as the "Detroit Tigers" in the first use of the nickname for the club.

May
 May 1 – The Detroit baseball club opened its season with an 11–6 victory over Toledo. The game, played on a Wednesday afternoon, attracted a crowd of 6,267. The game was preceded by a parade led by Mayor Pingree through the streets of Detroit that was viewed by "tens of thousands." In a pregame ceremony marking the opening of the season, Western League President Ban Johnson presented Mayor Pingree with a ball.  Former Detroit catcher Charlie Bennett, crippled in a train accident on e year earlier, was presented to a loud ovation, and Pingree threw the first pitch to him.
 May 8 – Woman protested at the State Capitol in advance of a vote on a bill granting women the right to vote.  The bill narrowly failed to receiver the required super majority.
 May 13 – The cornerstone was laid for Detroit Central High School (now known as Old Main on Wayne State's campus. Mayor Pingree and 1,500 high school student attended the ceremony.
 May 19 – The United States Geological Survey's annual report on the world's iron ore resources showed that Michigan remained the country's leading producer with 4.4 million tons produced in 1894. Michigan had been the country's leading producer of iron ore for six consecutive years.
 May 31 – The steamer Norman, of the Menominee line, sunk with the loss of life of three crew members after it was struck by a Canadian boat Jack in heavy fog off Middle island in Lake Huron near Alpena.

June
 June 5 – Oscar C. Fischer, age 28 of Detroit's Fischer Brothers firm, was arrested after he shot and killed Hugh McAfee, a constable of Springwells Township, after a dispute two days earlier at Frank Hall's saloon. Fischer claimed he acted in self defense after McAfee attacked him.
 June 9 – A fire in Kalamazoo destroyed one of that city's most important business blocks, causing $300,000 in damage. The fire started at Dewing & Sons lumber yard, where two young men were suspected of starting the blaze. The fire was blown west along Burdick Street and north to a warehouse by the wind along Kalamazoo fire department was assisted by a unit from Battle Creek. There were no fatalities.
 June 12 – A contest for control of Michigan's Republican Party, between factions loyal to Detroit Mayor Hazen S. Pingree and Joseph M. Weiss ended in victory for the Pingree faction. Frank A. Rasch was chosen as the new party chairman, replacing Weiss.

November
 November – A. Baushke & Bro. announced plans to build a factory in Benton Harbor, Michigan, to build their horseless carriages under the name Benton Harbor Motor Carriage Company. The Baushke automobile predated the earliest automobile of Henry Ford and is "believed to be the first motorized vehicle built completely from scratch."

Births
 February 18 – George Gipp, All-American football player for Notre Dame who was the subject of Knute Rockne's famous "Win just one for the Gipper" speech, in Laurium, Michigan

Deaths
 March 5 – Charles Lanman, author of "The History of Michigan" and "Michigan Red Book", government official, artist, librarian, and explorer, at age 81 in Washington, D.C.
 March 20 – Philip St. George Cooke, U.S. Army cavalry officer who served as a Union general in the American Civil War, noted for his authorship of an Army cavalry manual, and sometimes called the "Father of the U.S. Cavalry", at age 85 in Detroit
 March 24 – James Battle, fire chief in Detroit for 35 years and namesake of the James Battle, in Detroit
 May 12 – Theodore H. Hinchman, a leading Detroit businessman, at age 78 in Detroit
 May 19 – William Adair, a Detroit resident since 1834, state senator and nursery operator, at age 80 in Detroit

See also
 History of Michigan
 History of Detroit

References